Shelley Andres Smith (born May 21, 1987) is a former American football guard. He was drafted by the Houston Texans in the sixth round of the 2010 NFL Draft. He played college football at Colorado State.

Professional career

Houston Texans
Smith was drafted by the Houston Texans in the sixth round (187th pick overall) of the 2010 NFL Draft. He was the highest drafted CSU Rams offensive lineman since Clint Oldenburg in 2007. On June 16, 2010 Smith signed a four-year deal with the Texans worth $1.894 million. On October 6, 2010 Smith was waived. The next day Smith was signed to the teams practice squad. On December 1, 2010 Smith was signed to the teams active roster. On August 29, 2011 Smith was placed on injured reserve with an ankle injury, ending his season. On September 1, 2012 Smith was waived.

St. Louis Rams

On September 3, 2012 Smith was claimed off waivers by the St. Louis Rams. On October 21, 2012, Smith made his first career start at left guard against the Green Bay Packers. In 2013 Smith played 371 offensive snaps.

Miami Dolphins

After Smith's rookie contract expired, Smith signed with the Miami Dolphins on March 14, 2014. Smith rotated at many positions with the Dolphins. Smith had stints at right guard, left guard and center. He was released on March 10, 2015.

Denver Broncos
Smith signed a two-year contract with the Denver Broncos on March 13, 2015. On November 18, 2015, he was waived.

Second stint with Dolphins 
On December 22, 2015, Smith re-signed with the Dolphins.

References

External links
Colorado State Rams bio

1987 births
Living people
American football offensive guards
Colorado State Rams football players
Denver Broncos players
Houston Texans players
Miami Dolphins players
Players of American football from Phoenix, Arizona
St. Louis Rams players